A Form-Based Code (FBC) is a means of regulating land development to achieve a specific urban form. Form-Based Codes foster predictable built results and a high-quality public realm by using physical form (rather than separation of uses) as the organizing principle, with less focus on land use, through municipal regulations. An FBC is a regulation, not a mere guideline, adopted into city, town, or county law and offers a powerful alternative to conventional zoning regulation.

Form-Based Codes are a new response to the modern challenges of urban sprawl, deterioration of historic neighborhoods, and neglect of pedestrian safety in new development. Tradition has declined as a guide to development patterns, and the widespread adoption by cities of single-use zoning regulations has discouraged compact, walkable urbanism. Form-Based Codes are a tool to address these deficiencies, and to provide local governments the regulatory means to achieve development objectives with greater certainty.

Scope
Form-Based Codes address the relationship between building facades and the public realm, the form and mass of buildings in relation to one another, and the scale and types of streets and blocks. The regulations and standards in Form-Based Codes, presented in both diagrams and words, are keyed to a regulating plan that designates the appropriate form and scale (and therefore, character) of development rather than only distinctions in land-use types. This is in contrast to conventional zoning's focus on the micromanagement and segregation of land uses, and the control of development intensity through abstract and uncoordinated parameters (e.g., floor area ratios, dwelling units per acre, setbacks, parking ratios) to the neglect of an integrated built form. Not to be confused with design guidelines or general statements of policy, form-based codes are regulatory, not advisory.

Form-Based Codes are drafted to achieve a community vision based on time-tested forms of urbanism. Ultimately, a Form-Based Code is a tool; the quality of development outcomes is dependent on the quality and objectives of the community plan that a code implements.

History 
Form-Based Codes are part of a long history of shaping the built landscape. Such efforts go back to the urban designs of Hippodamus of Miletus, the planning of cities in ancient China, and Roman town planning. The Laws of the Indies, promulgated by the Spanish Crown starting in the 16th century, established some basic urban form requirements for colonial towns in the Americas. William Penn when planning Philadelphia in the 17th century did not shy from precise urban form requirements when he said, "Let every house be in a line, or upon a line, as much as may be." 

During the 18th century, Baroque urban design commonly brought buildings to the fronts of their lots with common facade treatments. Baron Haussmann, appointed by Napoleon III to oversee the redevelopment of Paris in the 19th century, stipulated precise ratios of building heights to street widths; disposition and sizes of windows and doors on building facades; consistent planting of street trees; and standardization of material colors to bring unity and harmony to the public environment.

Emergence
Regulating urban form is a challenge in modern democracies. Design guidelines adopted by municipalities, without legal enforceability, often invite capricious observance, thus failing to produce the comprehensive changes required to produce satisfying public places. When public planning exercises fail to produce predictable results, citizens often rebel against any development. In addition, from early in the twentieth century to the present, attempts at regulating the built landscape have usually been done for reasons that neglect community form, that are more concerned with the uses of property and impacts of scale than the form that development takes.  And a planning profession that in recent decades has focused on policy, neglecting design, encouraged an abstract intellectual response to problems that are largely physical in nature. 

The development of modern Form-Based Codes was started by architects, urban designers, and physical planners frustrated by the ineffectiveness of past criticisms of sprawl development and the failure of critics to propose realistic alternatives. These professionals, used to thinking physically about community problems, began the search for systematic physical solutions in the 1970s. Architect Christopher Alexander published A Pattern Language in 1977, a compendium of physical rules for designing humane buildings and places. Ian McHarg developed systematic mapping tools to encourage deliberate development patterns sensitive to local environmental conditions. Traditional Neighborhood Development ordinances were drafted beginning in the early 1990s as sets of development regulations to promote traditional neighborhood forms in new development projects. TND ordinances were typically adopted as an optional regulatory procedure that developers could request in place of conventional zoning. But their design regulations were not mapped to parcels or streets in advance, so lacked predictability of outcomes; TND ordinances proved to be an instructive effort, but showed few results.

Meanwhile, the accelerating scale of worldwide urban growth and the rapid expansion of the extent of cities heightened the need for regulatory tools better equipped to deal with such growth. The first serious attempt at creating a modern form-based code was done in 1982 to guide the development of the Florida resort town of Seaside by the husband and wife design team of Andres Duany and Elizabeth Plater-Zyberk. Realizing that designing an entire town would be an overwhelming task and would in the end lack the visual serendipity that only comes from myriad creative minds at work, they created a design code that established basic physical standards mapped to parcels, and then invited developers and architects to put their own distinctive stamp on their projects—but operating within those standards. The Seaside Code proved very successful; the resulting development of the town of Seaside is widely recognized as one of the most important and appealing planning efforts of the post-World War II era.

Duany/Plater-Zyberk's codes and the work of subsequent form-based code practitioners are not top-down mandates from imperial designers as in the baroque era or the wishful thinking of design guidelines that lack enforceability, but are instead legal regulations adopted by units of local government. As regulations they possess police power; violators of the regulations can be cited, and their invocation or retraction must go through a legislative process. As such, the community plays a more forceful role in shaping its physical future.

Recent developments 
Although the Seaside code was commissioned by a private developer, most current codes are commissioned by counties and municipalities. Since Seaside, the scale of Form-Based Coding projects has grown. Form-Based Coding can be applied at many scales, from a two-block main street to a county-wide region. An early Form-Based Code was adopted for downtown West Palm Beach in 1995. A significant code for a major urban arterial, the Columbia Pike in Arlington County, Virginia, was adopted in 2003 (Ferrell Madden Associates). A regional FBC was adopted in 2006 by St. Lucie County, Florida (Spikowski Associates, Dover-Kohl Partners). Duany/Plater-Zyberk has drafted a model FBC that is also a transect-based code that can be calibrated for local needs—the SMARTCODE. Its first attempted customization was done for Vicksburg, Mississippi in 2001 (Mouzon & Greene). The lessons learned there led to the first California adoption of a citywide Form-Based Code for the City of Sonoma in March 2003 (Crawford Multari & Clark Associates, Moule & Polyzoides), followed on June 16, 2003, by the first SmartCode adopted in the U.S., for central Petaluma, California (Fisher and Hall Urban Design, Crawford Multari & Clark Associates). SmartCodes are now being calibrated for Miami, Florida and Hurricane Katrina ravaged communities in Mississippi and Louisiana, along with cities as diverse as Taos, NM, Michigan City, IN, Jamestown, RI, Lawrence, KS, New Castle, DE, and Bran, Romania. Planetary climate change that must be mitigated by changes in the human environment will no doubt be an inducement to form-based and transect-based coding in the future.

The Cincinnati Form-Based Code adopted in 2013 is designed to be applied citywide in an incremental way, neighborhood by neighborhood. The code establishes transect zones and specifies standards for transects, building types, frontage types, walkable neighborhoods, and thoroughfares that can be adapted to each neighborhood.

Beaufort County, South Carolina adopted one of the first multijurisdictional Form-Based Codes at the end of 2014: In 2010, the County, the City of Beaufort and the City of Port Royal came together to hire Opticos Design, Inc. in Berkeley, California to draft the code.

Because of the growing number of consultants advertising themselves as capable of writing FBCs but with little or no training, in 2004 the non-profit Form-Based Codes Institute was organized to establish standards and teach best practices. In addition, SmartCode workshops are regularly scheduled by PlaceMakers.com, SmartCodePro.com, and SmartCodeLocal.com. In Spring 2014, a new graduate-level studio dedicated to Form-Based Coding was launched at California State Polytechnic University. “Form-Based Codes in the Context of Integrated Urbanism,” is one of the only full courses on the subject in the country. The course is taught by Tony Perez, Director of Form-Based Coding at Opticos Design.

Components
Form-Based Codes commonly include the following elements:

 Regulating Plan.  A plan or map of the regulated area designating the locations where different building form standards apply, based on clear community intentions regarding the physical character of the area being coded.
 Public Space Standards. Specifications for the elements within the public realm (e.g., sidewalks, travel lanes, on-street parking, street trees, street furniture, etc.).
 Building Form Standards. Regulations controlling the configuration, features, and functions of buildings that define and shape the public realm.
 Administration. A clearly defined application and project review process.
 Definitions. A glossary to ensure the precise use of technical terms.

Form-based codes also sometimes include:
 Architectural Standards. Regulations controlling external architectural materials and quality.
 Landscaping Standards. Regulations controlling landscape design and plant materials on private property as they impact public spaces (e.g. regulations about parking lot screening and shading, maintaining sight lines, insuring unobstructed pedestrian movements, etc.).
 Signage Standards. Regulations controlling allowable signage sizes, materials, illumination, and placement.
 Environmental Resource Standards. Regulations controlling issues such as storm water drainage and infiltration, development on slopes, tree protection, solar access, etc.
 Annotation. Text and illustrations explaining the intentions of specific code provisions.

Building Form Standards 

The types of buildings that make for a lively main street are different from the types of buildings that make for a quiet residential street. Building Form Standards are sets of enforceable design regulations for controlling building types and how they impact the public realm. These Standards are mapped to streets on a Regulating Plan. Building Form Standards can control such things as: the alignment of buildings to the street; how close buildings are to sidewalks; the visibility and accessibility of building entrances; minimum and maximum buildings heights; minimum or maximum lot frontage coverage; minimum and maximum amounts of window coverage on facades; physical elements required on buildings (e.g. stoops, porches, types of permitted balconies); and the general usage of floors (e.g. office, residential, or retail). These regulations are less concerned with architectural styles and designs than in how buildings shape public spaces. If a local government also wishes to regulate the quality of architecture—for example to preserve the historic appearance of a neighborhood—then Architectural Standards should be drafted in addition to Building Form Standards.

Public Space Standards 

Public Space Standards control the physical form of squares, parks, the public right-of-way of streets, and other public spaces. Public spaces are typically under the control of public works, parks, and highway departments. Streets, being the most common public spaces in a community, are the most frequently regulated. Public Space Standards for streets are typically described with dimensioned cross-sections and/or plan views showing travel lane widths, sidewalk widths, street tree and street lamp placement, locations of transit lanes, and the placement of architecture. Plan view diagrams may also be included showing spacing of street trees and lamps, and the radii of the curves of street corners.

Identification
How does one determine if a development regulation is a form-based code and a well-crafted one? Form-based codes generally receive affirmative answers to all of the following questions:

 Is the code's focus primarily on regulating urban form and less on land use?
 Is the code regulatory rather than advisory?
 Does the code emphasize standards and parameters for form with predictable physical outcomes (build-to lines, frontage type requirements, etc.) rather than relying on numerical parameters (floor-area ratios, density, etc.) whose outcomes are impossible to predict?
 Does the code require private buildings to shape public space through the use of building form standards with specific requirements for building placement?
 Does the code promote and/or conserve an interconnected street network and pedestrian-scaled blocks?
 Are regulations and standards keyed to specific locations on a regulating plan?
 Are the diagrams in the code unambiguous, clearly labeled, and accurate in their presentation of spatial configurations?

Implementation 
There are three ways that form-based codes are incorporated into a local government's development regulations:

Mandatory codes 
This is the most common adoption approach. It has the most regulatory  "teeth"—compliance is required. But it is the most ambitious of the approaches, making the new code a seamless part of, or a complete replacement for, the existing zoning ordinance. The form-based code can be adopted as a new zoning district or as an overlay district.

Unique to California and a few other states with appropriate enabling legislation, form-based codes can be contained within a planning document called a "specific plan," which can completely override the zoning ordinance for a given geographic area. Since it stands apart from the zoning ordinance, it can be more creative in its format, giving the coder greater freedom in designing for user-friendliness through page layout, diagrams, and illustrations. Also, the urban design plan and the implementing regulations are bundled together, greatly improving user comprehension. But since the specific plan is not securely integrated within the existing zoning ordinance, it may be more politically vulnerable to retraction.

Example adopted codes:
Winter Springs Town Center District Code, Winter Springs, Florida
Farmers Branch Station Area Form-Based Code, Farmers Branch, Texas
Central Petaluma Specific Plan and SmartCode, Petaluma, California
Oceanfront Resort District Form-Based Code, Virginia Beach, Virginia

Optional (parallel) codes.  
An optional or parallel form-based code serves as an alternative to, but doesn't replace, a present zoning ordinance. Compliance is voluntary. The developer has the choice of complying with the form-based code or the zoning ordinance, but it must be one or the other. This approach makes sense when compliance with the zoning ordinance is so difficult and time-consuming that most development is stymied. Thus a developer has the option of following a form-based code that will streamline and simplify his development process. But, for a local government to maintain two different sets of development regulations for one area is added work which can be significant if the area is extensive. Also depending on the area being regulated, if some developers are choosing the form-based code and others nearby are not, the possibilities for integrated place-making can be compromised.

Example codes:
Columbia Pike Form-Based Code, Arlington County, Virginia
Pike Road SmartCode, Pike Road, Alabama
Pass Christian SmartCode, Pass Christian, Mississippi

Floating-zone codes 
Floating zones are most often written to facilitate master-planned suburban communities and are called planned unit developments (PUDs). However, floating-zone codes are now being written as form-based codes to facilitate urban development. A floating-zone form-based code does not contain a regulating plan but includes instructions and standards for developers to follow when they prepare a regulating plan for their property (e.g. maximum block dimensions, street types, building types, open space accessibility, sidewalk widths.) This distinguishes floating-zone codes from the other two approaches–developers rather than the local government create the regulating plans and the urban designs that they facilitate, but the local government sets the standards. Floating-zone codes allow local governments to establish urban form standards for development without incurring the expense of developing urban design and regulating plans. Developers are given the freedom, within clear parameters, to prepare regulating plans for their property that are likely to meet government approval. A developer submits his or her regulating plan for approval through the rezoning process. Upon rezoning, the floating zone replaces the prior zoning for that property and the regulating plan becomes binding.

Example codes:
Miami-Dade County TND District, Miami-Dade County, Florida
Towns, Villages, Countryside Land Development Regulations, Saint Lucie County, Florida
Flowood SmartCode, Flowood, Mississippi
Montgomery SmartCode, Montgomery, Alabama (not to be confused with the mandatory SmartCode for downtown)

Initially a local government may wish to adopt a form-based code for its entire jurisdiction following one approach, but find this too ambitious with short-term resource and political limitations requiring a more focused effort. Instead it may wish to follow one approach for a smaller area, and then phase in other areas using the same or different approaches as needed. Or a floating-zone code could be adopted for large areas awaiting the public resources coming later that would allow the local government to draft its own regulating plans. Whatever approach is followed—or combination of approaches—simplicity and consistency helps at the permit desk where the code is implemented.

See also 
 Zoning in the United States
 Development control in the United Kingdom
 Statutory planning

References

External links 
 Form-Based Codes Institute
 Form-Based Codes: A Guide for Planners, Urban Designers, Municipalities, and Developers
 The Center for Applied Transect Studies
 The Seaside Institute
 Top 10 Misconceptions about form-based codes
 AARP Livability Fact Sheet Series Form-Based Code
 Form-Based Codes on Planetizen

Urban planning
Real property law
Zoning
New Urbanism